John Roveto (born February 20, 1958) is a former American football placekicker. He played for the Chicago Bears from 1981 to 1982. During his career, he played in 18 games over two seasons with the Bears. He made just 45.2% of his field goals, missing 17 of 31 attempts over his career.

Ironically, Roveto was replaced in 1983 by the man he was hired to replace two seasons earlier, Bob Thomas.

References

1958 births
Living people
American football placekickers
Louisiana Ragin' Cajuns football players
Dallas Cowboys players
Chicago Bears players
Chicago Blitz players
New Jersey Generals players
Players of American football from Fort Lauderdale, Florida